In Aboriginal mythology, Erathipa is a boulder that has the shape of a pregnant woman; contained within Erathipa are the souls of dead children which can inhabit the bodies of fertile young women. The fertility stone has an opening on one side.

The tribes of central Australia have... a huge rock known as Erathipa, which has an opening in one side from which the souls of the children imprisoned in it watch for a woman to pass by so that they may be reborn in her.  When women who do not want children go near the rock, they pretend to be old, and walk as if leaning on a stick, crying; "Don't come to me, I am an old woman!"
The idea implicit in all these rites, is that certain stones have the power to make sterile women fruitful, either because of the spirits of the ancestors that dwell in them, or because of their shape (the pregnant woman, "woman stone"), or because of their origin ("autogenesis").

References

Australian Aboriginal mythology